Ricardo Melchor Zamacois y Zabala (6 January 1847, Bilbao - 18 February 1888, Barcelona) was a Spanish actor and singer. He was half-brother of the historian Niceto de Zamacois, brother of the actress Elisa Zamacois and the painter Eduardo Zamacois y Zabala, and uncle of the writers Miguel Zamacois and Eduardo Zamacois, and the music composer Joaquín Zamacois.

Biography 
Ricardo Melchor Zamacois y Zabala was born on 6 January 1847 in Bilbao, son of Miguel Antonio de Zamacois y Berreteaga (1794-1863), a Professor at the Colegio de Humanidades de Vizcaya, and his second wife, Ruperta María del Pilar de Zabala y Arauco. He had several notable relatives. His family surname was originated in the French Basque city of Hasparren, where it was originally spelled "Samacoys".

Especially gifted for comedy, he began his career at the Café San Isidro in Madrid, where he developed his personal style. He was especially well known for his impersonations of notable figures, such as the bullfighter, and the tenor, Enrico Tamberlik.

In 1879, he married the actress, Emilia Ballesteros. In 1887, he discovered that she was having an affair. This ultimately led to a suicide attempt. He never fully recovered and was admitted to a mental hospital in Barcelona, where he died early the following year.

References 

1847 births
1888 deaths
Spanish male stage actors
19th-century Spanish male singers
People from Bilbao
Male actors from the Basque Country (autonomous community)
Spanish expatriates in France
19th-century Spanish male actors
Spanish impressionists (entertainers)